Pulli may refer to several places in Estonia:

Pulli, Pärnu County, village in Sauga Parish, Pärnu County
Pulli settlement, oldest known human settlement in Estonia
Pulli, Saare County, village in Orissaare Parish, Saare County
Pulli, Tartu County, village in Kambja Parish, Tartu County
Pulli, earlier name of Põdramõtsa, village in Rõuge Parish, Võru County
Pulli, Rõuge Parish, village in Rõuge Parish, Võru County
Pulli, Võru Parish, village in Võru Parish, Võru County